Lucia Liliana Mihalache (born July 5, 1967 in Arad) is a Romanian sport shooter. At age forty-one, Mihalache made her official debut for the 2008 Summer Olympics in Beijing, where she competed in women's skeet shooting. She placed tenth out of nineteen shooters in the qualifying rounds of the event, with a total score of 66 points.

At the 2012 Summer Olympics in London, Mihalache, however, struggled to maintain her position from Beijing, as she hit a total of 65 targets in women's skeet, finishing only in twelfth place, behind Thailand's Sutiya Jiewchaloemmit.

Mihalache is also a member of CSM Arad for the shooting class, and is coached and trained by Ciorba Attila.

References

External links
ISSF Profile
NBC Olympics Profile

Romanian female sport shooters
Living people
Olympic shooters of Romania
Shooters at the 2008 Summer Olympics
Shooters at the 2012 Summer Olympics
1967 births
Sportspeople from Arad, Romania